DeKalb County is a county located in the U.S. state of Tennessee. As of the 2020 census, the population was 20,080. Its county seat is Smithville. The county was created by the General Assembly of Tennessee on December 2, 1837, and was named for Revolutionary War hero Major General Johann de Kalb.

History

DeKalb County was formed in 1837 from land in Cannon, Warren and White counties. Historian Will T. Hale believes that the first settlers in the county were at Liberty and came from Maryland in 1797. If so, Addison Puckett was the first settler.

DeKalb County was the site of several saltpeter mines, the main ingredient of gunpowder, and was obtained by leaching the earth from several local caves. Overall Cave was named for Abraham Overall who moved from Luray, Virginia, and settled near the present site of Liberty in 1805. He reportedly had many slaves and owned a large plantation on which Overall Cave is located. Two saltpeter leaching vats in the cave may date from the War of 1812, although this area was mined again during the Civil War. Other caves in DeKalb County that were mined for saltpeter include Avant Cave, located near Dowelltown, Indian Grave Point Cave, located in the Dry Creek Valley, and Temperance Saltpeter Cave, located near Temperance Hall.

Geography

Adjacent counties
Putnam County (northeast)
White County (east)
Warren County (south)
Cannon County (southwest)
Wilson County (west)
Smith County (northwest)

State protected areas
Edgar Evins State Park
Pea Ridge Wildlife Management Area

Demographics

2020 census

As of the 2020 United States census, there were 20,080 people, 7,704 households, and 5,401 families residing in the county.

2000 census
As of the census of 2000, there were 17,423 people, 6,984 households, and 4,986 families residing in the county.  The population density was 57 people per square mile (22/km2).  There were 8,409 housing units at an average density of 28 per square mile (11/km2).  The racial makeup of the county was 95.58% White, 1.43% Black or African American, 0.28% Native American, 0.14% Asian, 0.02% Pacific Islander, 1.62% from other races, and 0.94% from two or more races.  3.63% of the population were Hispanic or Latino of any race.

There were 6,984 households, out of which 30.10% had children under the age of 18 living with them, 56.10% were married couples living together, 11.10% had a female householder with no husband present, and 28.60% were non-families. 25.50% of all households were made up of individuals, and 10.70% had someone living alone who was 65 years of age or older.  The average household size was 2.45 and the average family size was 2.90.

In the county, the population was spread out, with 23.30% under the age of 18, 8.50% from 18 to 24, 29.30% from 25 to 44, 24.60% from 45 to 64, and 14.30% who were 65 years of age or older.  The median age was 38 years. For every 100 females there were 97.70 males.  For every 100 females age 18 and over, there were 94.90 males.

The median income for a household in the county was $30,359, and the median income for a family was $36,920. Males had a median income of $29,483 versus $20,953 for females. The per capita income for the county was $17,217.  About 11.80% of families and 17.00% of the population were below the poverty line, including 20.00% of those under age 18 and 20.10% of those age 65 or over.

Communities

City
Smithville (county seat)

Towns
Alexandria
Dowelltown
Liberty

Unincorporated communities
Belk
Midway
Temperance Hall

Education
The DeKalb County School District consists of five public schools and an adult education center.
 DeKalb County High School (9–12) – opened 1963
 DeKalb Middle School (6–8) – opened 1971
 DeKalb West School (PreK–8) – opened 1973
 Northside Elementary School (2–5) – opened 2000
 Smithville Elementary School (PreK–2) – opened 1958

DeKalb County operated two high schools from the 1920s to 1963, Liberty High School and Smithville High School (originally Pure Fountain High School and later DeKalb County High School). In January 1962, Smithville High School burned down, and the present high school was constructed in a different part of town. When the school opened, Liberty High was closed and consolidated with DeKalb County beginning in September 1963.

Politics
DeKalb County is a Republican stronghold. The last Democrat to carry this county was Al Gore in 2000. Even before the rapid trend of the upland South away from the Democratic Party, DeKalb County was unusual for Middle Tennessee as it had significant Unionist sympathy and was a competitive county for the GOP even at the height of the “Solid South” era.

See also
National Register of Historic Places listings in DeKalb County, Tennessee

References

External links

 Official site
 Smithville-DeKalb County Chamber of Commerce
 DeKalb County Schools
 DeKalb County, TNGenWeb – genealogy resources

 
1837 establishments in Tennessee
Populated places established in 1837
Middle Tennessee
Counties of Appalachia